Hans "Hennes" Jäcker (20 November 1932 – 7 April 2013) was a German football player. He spent 11 years with Eintracht Braunschweig, including four seasons in the Bundesliga starting with the league's foundation in 1963.

After retiring as a player, Jäcker worked as a youth coach at Eintracht Braunschweig and for a time managed Regionalliga Nord side Leu Braunschweig. From 1980 to 1983 he also served as the president of Eintracht Braunschweig.

Honours
 Bundesliga champion: 1966–67

References

External links
 

1932 births
2013 deaths
People from Schwerte
Sportspeople from Arnsberg (region)
Footballers from North Rhine-Westphalia
German footballers
German football managers
Association football goalkeepers
Eintracht Braunschweig players
1. FC Köln players
Bundesliga players
Eintracht Braunschweig non-playing staff
German football chairmen and investors